The Virginia Museum of Contemporary Art (abbreviated as "Virginia MOCA") is a contemporary art museum in Virginia Beach, Virginia, USA, located at 2200 Parks Avenue, near the oceanfront resort area. The museum is on a landscaped campus adjacent to the eastern terminus of Interstate 264 near the Virginia Beach Convention Center and the Virginia Beach Tourist Information Center.

Origins
Virginia MOCA was born from the annual Boardwalk Art Show, which began in 1952 and is now the museum's largest fundraiser.

Accreditation
By operating at a national standard, Virginia MOCA received accreditation from the American Alliance of Museums in 2010.

References

Art museums and galleries in Virginia
Museums in Virginia Beach, Virginia